Ecphonesis is an emotional, exclamatory phrase (exclamation) used in poetry, drama, or song. It is a rhetorical device that originated in ancient literature.

A Latin example is "O tempora! O mores!" ("Oh, the times! Oh, the morals!"). A modern example is "Young man!" from the song YMCA by the Village People.

Edgar Allan Poe used ecphonesis in “The Tell-Tale Heart:” "Almighty God!--no, no! They heard!--they suspected!--they knew!--they were making a mockery of my horror!--this I thought, and this I think. But anything was better than this agony! Anything was more tolerable than this derision! I could bear those hypocritical smiles no longer! I felt that I must scream or die! and now--again!--hark! louder! louder! louder! louder! "'Villains!' I shrieked, 'dissemble no more! I admit the deed!--tear up the planks! here, here!--It is the beating of his hideous heart!'"Other examples of ecphonesis include when Homer Simpson said "No! No-no-no-no-no-no! Well, yes." during The Simpsons episode "Homer The Heretic," and when the Scarecrow said "Oh joy! Rapture! I got a brain!" in The Wizard of Oz.

Donald Trump used the expressions "Sad!" and "Wrong!" without elaboration throughout his 2016 US presidential campaign.

In Eastern Orthodox Liturgy 
In the Eastern Orthodox Church many prayers are recited silently by the priest who "speaks to God face-to-face" according to St. Symeon of Thessaloniki.  However, the closing words of such prayers are usually chanted aloud, especially at the closing of an ectenia (litany), and those closing words are called an ecphonesis.

Examples:

 In the anaphora (eucharistic prayer), the prayer following the sanctus is said silently by the priest but its ending, the Words of Institution, are intoned in a loud voice.
 During most ectenias the priest silently recites a prayer up to its last line and then, when the ectenia has concluded, he chants aloud that last line.

References

Rhetoric
Christian prayer
Eastern Christian liturgy